Lawrence Islary is an Indian politician. He was elected to the Assam Legislative Assembly from Kokrajhar East in the 2021 Assam Legislative Assembly election as a member of the United People's Party Liberal.

References

Living people
People from Kokrajhar district
Year of birth missing (living people)
United People's Party Liberal politicians